Kallur kot, is a town in Bhakkar District in the Punjab Province of Pakistan.

The town is the headquarters of Kaloorkot Tehsil. The town of Kallur kot is itself a Union councils. During British rule the railway station at Kallur kot was built as part of the North-Western Railway route.

Kallur Kot is situated at a distance of 60 Kilometers to the north of Bhakkar on the main railway line to Mianwali on the eastern bank of the river Indus. There are livestock farm Ghulaman. Kallur Kot. Semen Production and Fareeda Garden at Kallur Kot. Likewise, other district Tehsil has an extreme climate. The maximum temperature goes up to 50 °C and minimum to 28 °C. The hottest months are June, July, and August. Winter is equally cold and frosty with a maximum at -1 °C.

The Indus, by the times, passes from Kallur Kot tehsil to Bhakkar Tehsil loses much of the velocity with which the water rushed from the gorge at Tehsil Kallur Koy and throughout the Bhakkar Tehsil confines itself to more or less defined course.

References 

Populated places in Bhakkar District